Borj-e Ali Shir (also Romanized as Borj-e ‘Alī Shīr; also known as Borj-e ‘Alī Shīr-e Soflá) is a village in Dehdasht-e Gharbi Rural District, in the Central District of Kohgiluyeh County, Kohgiluyeh and Boyer-Ahmad Province, Iran. At the 2006 census, its population was 405, in 73 families.

References 

Populated places in Kohgiluyeh County